{{Speciesbox
| image = Marble Shirmp (6851478510).jpg
| genus = Saron
| species = marmoratus
| authority = (Olivier, 1811) 
| synonyms = * Hippolyte gibberosus H. Milne Edwards, 1837
 Hippolyte hemprichii Heller, 1861
 Hippolyte leachii Guérin-Méneville, 1838 
 Hyppolite kraussii Bianconi, 1869
 Nauticaris grandirostris Pearson, 1905
 Palaemon marmoratus Olivier, 1811
| synonyms_ref = 
}}Saron marmoratus, the marbled shrimp, is a species of "cleaner shrimp" from the family Thoridae, although its taxonomic position is subject to some controversy as many authorities have considered it to be a member of the family Hippolytidae sensu lato. It's normally found in the Indo-Pacific region but in 2013 it was found off the coast of Lebanon, probably having reached the Mediterranean by Lessepsian migration through the Suez Canal from the Red Sea. It is a popular species in aquaria due to its easy care.

DescriptionSaron marmoratus is a rather hunch-backed dumpy species of shrimp. Its rostrum is slightly longer than its carapace and is strongly recurved, it has 1 or 2 spines on its dorsal margin, followed by 3 or 4 spines on the carapace, and there are 8-10 long spines on the ventral margin of the carapace. The dorsal margin of the carapace and the abdomen have tufts of setae, which are denser in the females. The males have elongated chaelae which are longer than body  and the females possess an obvious brush-like structure of setae on the first pair of legs. The legs feature brown or blue transverse bands. They are variable in colour and the ground colour can be red, blue or brown, mottled with brown or green, the legs are marked with blue or brown transverse bans.

DistributionSaron marmoratus has an Indo-Pacific distribution. Its distribution extends from the Red Sea south to Madagascar and Mozambique east through the Persian Gulf, India, south east Asia through the southern Pacific, including Australia as far as Hawaii. In 2013 specimens were observed close to underwater caves off the coast of Lebanon, and it is likely that this species undergone a Lessepsian migration through the Suez Canal from the Red Sea into the Levantine Sea.

BiologySaron marmoratus is occasionally seen on reefs but it is more frequently found among coral and coral rubble, in the infralittoral to sublittoral zone, within lagoons. It is quite an inactive species which relies on camouflage against the often encrusted substrate. When threatened, it quickly but stealthily swim into a hiding place but, if immediate danger threatens, it can shoot off very quickly and for some distance.  It is nocturnal and it can vary the colour of its body so that at night it turns primarily red, camouflaging the shrimpin the twilight.Saron marmoratus is an omnivore which sifts through the fine substrate at night searching for organic detritus, plankton and other edible items. It has also been known to scavenge on larger food items, such as fish, which fall to the sea bed. It normally does not forage below 12m in depth but it tends to remain close to the reefs. They have also been known to feed on coral and polyps.

Human useSaron marmoratus'' is in high demand for the aquarium hobby and fetch good prices in the marine aquarium trade. Specimens on the European market are usually collected from the Red Sea, while those for sale in North America are collected in Hawaii.

Gallery

References

External links
 

Alpheoidea
Crustaceans described in 1811